The Park Plaza Apartments were one of the first and most prominent Art Deco apartment buildings erected in the Bronx in New York City. The eight-story, polychromatic terra cotta embellished structure at 1005 Jerome Avenue and West 164th Street was designed by Horace Ginsberg and Marvin Fine and completed in 1931.  It is an eight-story building divided into five blocks or section, each six bays wide.  There are about 200 apartments, ranging from one to five rooms.

Officially designated a New York City Landmark in 1981, and listed on the National Register of Historic Places in 1982, it faced the lushly treed landscape of Macombs Dam Park until 2006, when the  park  was condemned for a new Yankee Stadium.

See also
List of New York City Designated Landmarks in The Bronx
National Register of Historic Places in Bronx County, New York

References

Residential buildings on the National Register of Historic Places in New York City
Residential buildings completed in 1931
History of the Bronx
New York City Designated Landmarks in the Bronx
Art Deco architecture in the Bronx
National Register of Historic Places in the Bronx
Highbridge, Bronx
Residential buildings in the Bronx